"Beat of Life" is a 2003 single by DJ Tomekk from his second album Beat of Life Vol. 1. It features guest vocal appearances from American rappers Ice-T and Trigga tha Gambler, as well as Guano Apes vocalist Sandra Nasić. The song peaked at No. 12 in Germany.

Music video
A music video was created for the song. It begins with DJ Tomekk, Ice-T, Trigga tha Gambler and Coco Austin in a car waiting for somebody. Trigga complains about why the person is taking so long to arrive, leading to an argument between him and Ice-T which is only stopped when the man they are waiting for approaches the car. The man starts giving cash to Ice-T, who complains that it is not enough. Sirens appear in the background, leading to an argument between Ice-T and the man outside the car. Ice-T grabs the man by the collar and pulls him against the car as police cars arrives. Police officers grab the man outside the car and Ice-T speeds off, knocking over barrels and getting shot at by police as the car leaves. The music for the song begins, along with brief footage of a high speed chase. Ice-T can next be seen rapping at a streetball match, where DJ Tomekk can be seen performing on turntables. Trigga raps his verses at the event, whilst SWAT agents climb a staircase. The SWAT agents confront Sandra Nasić, who sings her lyrics as the laser sights from their weapons shine on her body. At one point Ice-T completely exposes Coco Austin's breasts whilst he is rapping; the footage was usually censored though uncensored copies exist. DJ Tomekk struggles with two police officers who are trying to apprehend him, before he smashes one of their heads through a window. The video ends with the camera zooming in on Trigga, Coco, Ice-T, DJ Tomekk and several others standing silently.

Track listing

Charts

References

External links

2003 songs
Ice-T songs
2003 singles
Rap rock songs
Songs written by Ice-T